The modern pentathlon competition at the 2018 Central American and Caribbean Games was held from 20 to 23 July at the Club Campestre de Cali in Cali, Colombia.

Medal summary

Medal table

References

External links
2018 Central American and Caribbean Games – Modern Pentathlon

2018 Central American and Caribbean Games events
Central American and Caribbean Games
2018
Qualification tournaments for the 2019 Pan American Games